Chillar is an Indian surname. Notable persons with the name include:

Brandon Chillar (born 1982), American football linebacker
Manjeet Chillar (born 1986), Indian kabaddi player
Manushi Chhillar (born 1997),  Indian model and beauty pageant titleholder
Prayag Jha Chillar (born 1945), Indian artist